Whitney Sudler-Smith (born June 2, 1968) is an American filmmaker, television director, and classically trained guitarist. He is the Creator and Executive Producer of Bravo's Southern Charm, a "reality docu-series" about life in Charleston, South Carolina. He is also an executive producer on the Savannah and New Orleans spin-off shows.

Early years
Sudler-Smith was born June 2, 1968 in Washington, D.C. but brought up in Virginia. His mother is Patricia Altschul (then Pat Dey-Smith), a socialite and prominent art dealer at the time. He graduated from Georgetown Day School and George Washington University, and studied at Oxford University and the Alliance Française in Paris. His late father Lon Hayes Smith was an Investment Banker at Morgan Stanley and resided on the Eastern Shore of Maryland.

Career
After arriving in Los Angeles in 1996, Sudler-Smith directed two small films Going for Baroque and Afternoon Delight. In 1998 he released the Indie film Bubba and Ike, a "redneck buddy comedy" starring Jesse Borrego and Elisa Gabrielli that was first screened at the Austin Film Festival. In 2002 Smith wrote and directed Torture TV, another Indie film that starred Danny Huston and Trevor Goddard. He is also a screenwriter.

In 2010 Sudler-Smith directed the documentary Ultrasuede: In Search of Halston about Roy Halston, the famous fashion designer who helped to create the casual chic look. The film focused on Studio 54 and the club scene in Manhattan in the 1970s, using archival footage and interviews of personalities including Anjelica Huston, Billy Joel, Liza Minnelli, and Anthony Haden-Guest. After an international theatrical release, the movie was sold to Showtime, and can be subsequently seen on Amazon Prime and Peacock. In reviewing the film, critic Owen Gleiberman of Variety and Entertainment Weekly gave it an A−, stating the film ‘has a grander trajectory than just about any other fashion doc.” The film was met with mostly negative reviews and currently holds a 33% on review aggregating site Rottentomatoes.com.

Sudler-Smith is creator and executive producer of Southern Charm, a reality show on Bravo that chronicles the social life of Charleston, SC.  Filming of the second season finished in November, 2014. Southern Charm looks at the life of six young professionals in Charleston including a novice lawyer, an aspiring fashion designer, and Thomas Ravenel, a local celebrity who was forced to resign as state treasurer of South Carolina after being indicted on cocaine charges. Ravenel is still "pursuing a political career with utter delusion," noted a reviewer about the show. "He plots his comeback while also getting sloshed and hooking up with a 21-year-old. In other words, he is reality TV gold."

Sudler-Smith is also the executive producer of two spin-off series, Southern Charm Savannah and Southern Charm New Orleans.

"Whitney Sudler-Smith is plenty interesting, but he’s nothing compared to his mother, Patricia Altschul, a woman who wakes up and tells her butler she’s ready for her morning cocktail with the signal, 'It’s time for my medicine!'" wrote Gregory Miller in The New York Post. She's the widow of Arthur Goodhart Altschul Sr., the prominent New York art collector and philanthropist who was longtime General Partner of Goldman Sachs. On the show, Patricia Altschul sometimes provides commentary on the younger crowd's activities with icy wit. When Sudler-Smith announced plans during the show's first season to open a restaurant in Charleston, his mother told him, “I think that’s a little out of your realm.” The show is sometimes filmed in Mikell House, a 9,480-square-foot mansion built in 1851 that Patricia Altschul bought in downtown Charleston.

Sudler-Smith is in pre-production on the scripted comedy Family Office.

References

External links
 
 Whitney Sudler-Smith - Bio on BravoTV.com

English-language film directors
American male screenwriters
American television directors
American socialites
George Washington University alumni
Participants in American reality television series
1968 births
Living people
Georgetown Day School alumni
Screenwriters from Washington, D.C.
Screenwriters from Virginia
Film directors from Washington, D.C.
Film directors from Virginia
Film producers from Virginia
Television personalities from Washington, D.C.
Television personalities from Virginia
21st-century American screenwriters
21st-century American male writers